The 5th Parliament of Ontario was in session from February 27, 1883, until November 15, 1886, just prior to the 1886 general election. The majority party was the Ontario Liberal Party  led by Oliver Mowat.

Charles Clarke served as speaker for the assembly.

Notes

References 
A History of Ontario : its resources and development., Alexander Fraser
 Members in Parliament 5 

05
1883 establishments in Ontario
1886 disestablishments in Ontario